Tabajd is a village in Fejér county, Hungary. Tabajd borders villages called Alcsútdoboz and Vál. Tabajd also has a park called Mezitlábas Park, which translates to Barefeet Park and this park lets you walk around on different types of ground barefoot like rock, stone, sand, etc.

External links 
 Street map 

Populated places in Fejér County